Daniel Carl Tjärnqvist (born October 14, 1976) is a Swedish former professional ice hockey defenceman who played in the National Hockey League (NHL) with the Atlanta Thrashers, Minnesota Wild, Edmonton Oilers and the Colorado Avalanche. His younger brother, Mathias, is an assistant coach in Malmö Redhawks in the Swedish elite league Elitserien.

Playing career 
Tjärnqvist is considered a smart player who plays safe and is a good two-way defenceman. He was drafted by the Florida Panthers as their fourth-round pick, 88th overall, in the 1995 NHL Entry Draft; however, Tjärnqvist never played a game for the team.

After four years with Djurgården in the Swedish Elitserien, Tjärnqvist spent three seasons with the Atlanta Thrashers in the National Hockey League; after the 2004–05 lockout he played for the Minnesota Wild.

On July 6, 2006, Tjärnqvist signed a one-year deal with the Edmonton Oilers. Daniel established himself in the Oilers defense until he was beset with a pubic bone injury, missing the majority of the 2006–07 NHL season. Tjärnqvist, a free agent, then spent the 2007–08 season in the Russian Super League reportedly signing with Ak Bars Kazan, before formally signing a contract with Lokomotiv Yaroslavl.

On July 3, 2008, with the option to remain in Russia, Tjärnqvist instead came back for a second stint in the NHL, signing a one-year contract with the Colorado Avalanche. Tjärnqvist was used primarily as a reserve defenseman before succumbing to a concussion to end his 2008–09 campaign.

On May 24, 2009, Tjärnqvist signed a one-year contract to return to Russia with his previous team, Lokomotiv Yaroslavl of the KHL, for the 2009–10 season. Establishing himself as Lokomotiv's best defensive defender, he appeared in 54 games, notching 10 points and adding 3 more in Yaroslavl's run to the Western Conference finals. On June 18, 2010, he was re-signed by the KHL team to a further one-year deal.

On June 27, 2011, Tjärnqvist returned to Djurgården in Swedish Elitserien signing a one plus one optional year contract. As an Alternate captain with the club, he was primarily used as a stay at home defenseman and produced 14 points in 45 games during the 2011–12 season.

On May 12, 2012, Tjärnqvist opted not to extend his contract in Sweden and signed a one-year deal with a German club, Kölner Haie, of the DEL. Upon spending the 2014–15 season with Haie, Tjärnqvist sat out the following season as a free agent before announcing his retirement from professional hockey on June 1, 2016.

Records
 First Swedish player to win the SM-liiga (1997).

Career statistics

Regular season and playoffs

International

Awards 
 SM-liiga champion with Jokerit in 1997.
 Elitserien playoff winner with Djurgården in 2000 and 2001.
 World Championship's Best Defenceman in 2002.
 Olympic gold medal at the 2006 Turin Olympics.

See also 
 Notable families in the NHL

References

External links

1976 births
Living people
Atlanta Thrashers players
Colorado Avalanche players
Columbus Blue Jackets coaches
Djurgårdens IF Hockey players
Edmonton Oilers players
Expatriate ice hockey players in Russia
Florida Panthers draft picks
Ice hockey players at the 2006 Winter Olympics
Jokerit players
Kölner Haie players
Lokomotiv Yaroslavl players
Medalists at the 2006 Winter Olympics
Minnesota Wild players
Olympic ice hockey players of Sweden
Olympic gold medalists for Sweden
Olympic medalists in ice hockey
Sportspeople from Umeå
Rögle BK players
Swedish expatriate ice hockey players in Canada
Swedish expatriate ice hockey players in Finland
Swedish expatriate sportspeople in Russia
Swedish expatriate ice hockey players in the United States
Swedish ice hockey defencemen